Past and Present Danger is a Hardy Boys novel. It was first published in 2001 by Pocket Books.

Clayton Silvers was once a well-known figure in investigative reporting, then he was charged with bribery and fraud. He has returned to Bayport, but an old high-school friend defends his case: Gertrude Hardy, Frank and Joe's aunt. Now, Frank and Joe do not know whom to trust, but, as the level of danger escalates, they must choose or pay the price.

References

The Hardy Boys books
2001 American novels
2001 children's books